Sweet spot or Sweet Spot may refer to:

Arts

Albums
Sweet Spot, by Nino Del Pesco, 1994
Sweet Spot, compilation by The Sugarman 3, 2001
Sweet Spot, by Yura Yura Teikoku, 2005
Sweet Spot, by Kevin Toney, 2003
Sweet Spot, by Danny Weis, 2006

Songs
"Sweet Spot" (Flo Rida song), by Flo Rida featuring Jennifer Lopez from Wild Ones 
"Sweet Spot", by Emmylou Harris and Linda Ronstadt from Western Wall: The Tucson Sessions
"Sweet Spot" (Kim Petras song), 2019
"Sweet Spot", by Sara Evans from Slow Me Down
"Sweet Spot", by Tokyo Jihen from Sports
"Sweet Spot", by Wild Beasts from Present Tense
"The Sweet Spot", by The Duckworth Lewis Method from their eponymous album

Other
Sweet spot (acoustics)
Sweet spot (economics)
Sweet spot (sports)
The sweet spot in phonation
 Sweet Spot (manga), 1989 manga by Yutsuko Chūsonji and its 1991 film adaptation